Karl Fredrik Virtanen (born 15 November 1971 in Motala, Östergötland County) is a Sweden-Finnish journalist and former columnist for the Swedish newspaper Aftonbladet and the host for the talk show Studio Virtanen on Swedish TV8. He has also hosted radio shows for Sveriges Radio. For Aftonbladet, he was the New York City correspondent, contributing weekly columns about life in the city. He also reported on entertainment, such as the Eurovision Song Contest. 

In October 2017, the Swedish media reported accusations from multiple women of Virtanen's sexual assault and sexual harassment after the hashtag Me Too went viral. In 2019, the District Attorney's Office in Stockholm prosecuted Cissi Wallin, one of the women accusing Virtanen, with aggravated criminal defamation. She was given a suspended sentence and ordered to pay 90,000 kronor in damages to Virtanen. Wallin said she would be appealing the sentence.

Fredrik Virtanen wrote the Swedish and Norwegian book Utan nåd (No Mercy) about controversial journalism during the Swedish Me Too movement.

In 2020 Aftonbladet purchased and published an article by Virtanen; Karin Pettersson, head of Culture in Aftonbladet, said that she did not believe in being banned from one's profession.

In 2022, Swedish-American journalist Jenny Nordberg published an extensive article in The New York Times, describing the Swedish legal system regarding libel and the consequences for women speaking out against sexual abuse:
"Unlike in the United States, where truth is widely considered to be an absolute defense in defamation cases, Swedish law takes a two-step approach. The court first decides whether the alleged defamation is "justifiable"— that is, whether it's of broad public interest. Only if the court decides that a statement is justifiable will it move on to consider whether or not it is true. In this case, despite Mr. Virtanen's being one of the highest-profile writers at the country's largest newspaper, the court concluded that he was not enough of a public figure to justify public interest in his personal conduct. Ms. Wallin's posts, in other words, were not justifiable, and as a result, it didn't matter whether her account of their encounter was accurate. 'The court will not review whether the statements were true,' the verdict read." Nordberg also described her own experiences with Virtanen's misogyny.

Bibliography 
 Olyckligt kär i ingen speciell (2006)
 Kraschad (2009)
 Utan nåd (2019)

References

1971 births
Living people
People from Motala Municipality
Swedish journalists
Swedish television journalists
Swedish bloggers
Swedish people of Finnish descent